

Champions

Major League Baseball
World Series: New York Yankees over St. Louis Cardinals (4-1)
All-Star Game, July 13 at Shibe Park: American League, 5-3

Other champions
Amateur World Series: Cuba
Negro League World Series: Homestead Grays over Birmingham Black Barons (4-3)
Negro League Baseball All-Star Game: West, 2-1
All-American Girls Professional Baseball League: Racine Belles over Kenosha Comets

Awards and honors
Most Valuable Player
Spud Chandler (AL) – P, New York Yankees
Stan Musial (NL) – 1B, St. Louis Cardinals
The Sporting News Player of the Year Award
Spud Chandler – P, New York Yankees
The Sporting News Most Valuable Player Award
Spud Chandler (AL) – P, New York Yankees
Stan Musial (NL) – 1B, St. Louis Cardinals
The Sporting News Manager of the Year Award
Joe McCarthy (AL) – New York Yankees

Statistical leaders

Major league baseball final standings

American League final standings

National League final standings

Negro league baseball final standings

Negro American League final standings
This was the seventh season of the Negro American League. Birmingham and Chicago each won a half of the season, which therefore matched them up in a matchup to determine the champion for the NAL pennant to determine who would make the 1943 Negro World Series. Birmingham prevailed in five games to win their first ever pennant.

Negro National League final standings
This was the eleventh season of the second Negro National League (1933–1948). For the sixth time in seven seasons, the Homestead Grays won the pennant, this time under manager Candy Jim Taylor.

Negro league playoffs
Negro American League Championship Series: Birmingham Black Barons over Chicago American Giants 3–2.
1943 Negro World Series: Homestead Grays over Birmingham Black Barons 4–3 (one tie).

Events
 May 30 – The All-American Girls Professional Baseball League begins its first 108-game season with teams in Rockford, Kenosha, Racine, and South Bend. In the Opening Game, South Bend win Rockford in 14 innings by a 4–3 score. The league's total attendance for the year will be 176,612.
July 1 – The first AAGPBL All-Star Game is played, which coincidentally became the first night game ever played at Wrigley Field. The contest was realized under temporary lights between two teams composed of Kenosha Comets and Racine Belles players against Rockford Peaches and South Bend Blue Sox players.
July 13 – At Shibe Park, home of the Philadelphia Athletics, the American League defeats the National League, 5-3, in the All-Star Game. This is the first All-Star Game held at night.
October 11 – The New York Yankees defeat the St. Louis Cardinals, 2-0, in Game 5 of the World Series to win their tenth World Championship, four games to one.  This would be Yankees' manager Joe McCarthy's final Series win.
November 23 – Commissioner Kenesaw Mountain Landis rules that Philadelphia Phillies owner William D. Cox is permanently ineligible to hold office or be employed for having bet on his own team. The Carpenter family of Delaware will buy the Philadelphia club and Bob Carpenter, at age 28, will become president. The Phillies, in an effort to change their image, will conduct a contest for a new name. The winning entry, the Philadelphia Blue Jays, submitted by a Mrs. John Crooks, will be the unofficial team name for 1944-45 until abandoned in 1946.
 December 2 – With only nine leagues operating during the season, the minor league convention in New York has an incipient revolt to oust longtime head William G. Bramham in favor of Frank Shaughnessy, president of the International League, who had five pledges. But Bramham rules that 15 non operating circuits which had paid dues are eligible to vote. Five of the leagues had given proxies. A later appeal to Commissioner Landis fails.
December 4 – After one disappointing season for the Washington Senators, veteran slugger Indian Bob Johnson is sold to the Boston Red Sox. Senators owner Clark Griffith will later call it the worst trade he ever made. Johnson will have two solid years in Fenway Park before retiring.

Births

January
January 1 – Bud Hollowell, American baseball player and manager (d. 2014)
January 3 – Adrian Garrett
January 3 – Bob Gebhard
January 4 – Larry Yellen
January 7 – Dave Gray
January 10 – Jim Campbell
January 14 – Ron Clark
January 14 – Dave Marshall
January 15 – Mike Marshall
January 25 – Brian McCall
January 26 – César Gutiérrez
January 27 – Doug Adams
January 30 – Davey Johnson

February
February 1 – Ron Woods
February 8 – Bob Oliver
February 12 – Paul Edmondson
February 14 – Darrell Osteen
February 15 – Don Arlich
February 15 – Joe Moeller
February 16 – Bobby Darwin
February 19 – Jim Cosman
February 19 – Gail Hopkins
February 21 – Jack Billingham
February 21 – Joe Foy

March
March 3 – Jack DiLauro
March 3 – Paul Schaal
March 3 – Ed Sukla
March 16 – Rick Reichardt
March 20 – Steve Dillon
March 23 – Bruce Howard
March 23 – Lee May

April
April 1 – Mike DeGerick
April 3 – Barry Moore
April 4 – Mike Epstein
April 6 – Marty Pattin
April 8 – John Hiller
April 9 – Roy Gleason
April 12 – Vicente Romo
April 12 – Ken Suarez
April 16 – Frank Fernández
April 24 – Ivan Murrell
April 24 – Joe Verbanic
April 25 – Bob Johnson
April 25 – Lew Krausse Jr.

May
May 4 – Dick Nold
May 5 – John Donaldson
May 7 – Steve Whitaker
May 20 – Dave McDonald
May 22 – Walt Hriniak
May 22 – Tommy John
May 31 – Jackie Brown

June
June 3 – Ron Keller
June 6 – Merv Rettenmund
June 9 – Bruce Look
June 12 – Sam Parrilla
June 13 – Masaaki Kitaru
June 15 – Al Closter
June 20 – Andy Etchebarren
June 25 – John Gelnar
June 26 – Bill Robinson
June 27 – Rico Petrocelli

July
July 5 – Curt Blefary
July 8 – George Culver
July 9 – Mike Andrews
July 12 – Ron Willis
July 15 – Dave Adlesh
July 21 – Jim Manning
July 28 – Dick Simpson
July 28 – Ron Theobald
July 29 – Bill Whitby
July 31 – Billy Wynne

August
August 1 – Jackie Warner
August 2 – Tom Burgmeier
August 5 – Nelson Briles
August 6 – Jim Hardin
August 8 – Jim Miles
August 11 – Leroy Reams
August 17 – Ken Turner
August 20 – Hal Kurtz
August 21 – Félix Millán
August 22 – José Arcia
August 23 – Ed Barnowski
August 23 – Al Montreuil
August 28 – Lou Piniella
August 29 – Randy Brown

September
September 1 – Fred Rath Sr.
September 2 – Luke Walker
September 4 – Bobby Guindon
September 6 – Jim Quick
September 7 – Tommy Matchick
September 12 – Floyd Wicker
September 19 – Mike Derrick
September 19 – Joe Morgan
September 20 – Rich Morales
September 23 – Winston Llenas
September 23 – Marcelino López

October
October 2 – Paul Dicken
October 4 – Jimy Williams
October 6 – Jim McGlothlin
October 6 – Jerry Stephenson
October 7 – José Cardenal
October 8 – Don Pepper
October 13 – Jerry Robertson
October 19 – Sandy Alomar Sr.
October 19 – Brock Davis
October 20 – Bobby Floyd
October 22 – Bobby Mitchell
October 31 – John Hoffman
October 31 – Fred Klages
October 31 – Bill Voss

November
November 4 – Dick Selma
November 9 – Jerry Weinstein
November 12 – Al Schmelz
November 13 – Bobby Pfeil
November 14 – Danny Lazar
November 16 – Greg Bollo
November 17 – Bruce Von Hoff
November 18 – Dick Joyce
November 18 – Jim Shellenback
November 19 – Aurelio Monteagudo
November 21 – Daryl Patterson
November 22 – Wade Blasingame
November 24 – Billy Harris
November 29 – Dan McGinn

December
December 3 – Jerry Johnson
December 9 – Jim Merritt
December 10 – Dalton Jones
December 12 – Derrell Griffith
December 13 – Tony Torchia
December 14 – Jerry May
December 19 – Walt Williams
December 20 – John Noriega
December 23 – Ron Allen
December 23 – Dave May
December 24 – Al Stanek
December 25 – Dennis Musgraves
December 27 – Roy White

Deaths

January
January   3 – Bid McPhee, 83, Hall of Fame second baseman who played his entire 18-year career with the Cincinnati Reds, beginning in 1882 when the organization was a part of the American Association and called the Red Stockings. Widely regarded as one of the best defensive second basemen in the 19th century, even though he took the field without benefit of a glove, McPhee retired in 1899 with a career .272 batting average, 2,258 hits, 1,684 runs, 189 triples, 568 stolen bases and a .944 fielding average, while also managing the Reds in 1901 and 1902.
January   3 – Jack Rafter, 67, catcher who played for the Pittsburgh Pirates in its 1904 season.  
January   7 – Ted Welch, 50, who appeared in three games as a relief pitcher for the St. Louis Terriers of the Federal League in 1914.
January   8 – John Titus, 66, outfielder who played from 1903 through 1912 with the Philadelphia Phillies and the Boston Braves. 
January 12 – Bill Webb, 47, whose professional career lasted for 14 seasons, beginning as a second baseman for the Pittsburgh Pirates in 1916 and ending in 1930, becoming a manager in the minor leagues after that, and later serving the Chicago White Sox as a coach and farm system director from 1935 until his death.
January 23 – Farmer Weaver, 77, outfielder who played from 1888 to 1894 for the Louisville Colonels and Pittsburgh Pirates.  
January 24 – Pat O'Connell, 81, center fielder who played for the Baltimore Orioles of the American Association during the 1886 season.

February
February 3 – Jake Virtue, 77, first baseman who played from 1890 through 1894 for the Cleveland Spiders.
February 4 – Frank Dwyer, 74, pitcher for five teams in a span of twelve years from 1888–1899, who posted a 176–152 record and a 3.85 ERA in 365 pitching appearances, including two 20-win season, 12 shutouts and 270 complete games.
February 7 – Floyd Ritter, 72, backup catcher for the 1890 Toledo Maumees of the American Association.
February 8 – Dan Casey, 80, pitcher who posted a 96-90 record with a 2.18 earned run average for four teams in seven seasons from 1884–1890, twice winning more than 20 games for the Philadelphia Quakers, while leading the National League in 1887 in both ERA (2.86) and shutouts (4), and ending third in W–L% (6.83) and fourth in wins (28).
February 11 – Ralph McLaurin, 57, fourth outfielder for the St. Louis Cardinals in the 1908 season.
February 12 – Bart Cantz, 83, catcher who played from 1888 through 1890 with the Baltimore Orioles and the Philadelphia Athletics of the American Association.
February 15 – John Deering, pitcher who played in 1903 with the Detroit Tigers and the New York Highlanders of the American League.
February 17 – Hippo Galloway, 60, turn-of-the-century player for the Cuban X-Giants, considered the first black Canadian to play organized baseball.

March
March 2 – Earle Gardner, 59, backup infielder who played from 1908 through 1912 for the New York Highlanders of the American League.
March 3 – Bill Whaley, 44, outfielder for the 1923 St. Louis Browns of the American League.
March 6 – Jimmy Collins, 73, Hall of Fame third baseman and manager who spent the majority of his fourteen-year Major League career in Boston with either the Beaneaters and the Americans; a fine hitter but best remembered for his defensive play at third base, whether it setting up defensively away from the bag or mastering the art of defense against the bunt;  a .300 hitter five times, with a high of .346 in 1897, he won the National League home run crown with 15 in 1898, driving in well over 100 runs in both seasons and scoring more than 100 runs four times; specifically credited with having developed the barehanded pickup and off-balance throw to first base in defending bunts, his 601 total chances accepted at third base in 1899 remain a National League record, additionally leading his league's third basemen in putouts five times, assists four times, double plays twice, he still stands second all-time in career putouts at third base, and also managed the Americans to two American League pennants and a triumph over the Pittsburgh Pirates in the first modern World Series in 1903.
March 13 – Earl Smith, 52, corner outfielder and third baseman for the Chicago Cubs, St. Louis Browns and Washington Senators in seven seasons from 1916 through 1923.
March 20 – Heinie Wagner, 62, shortstop who played for the New York Giants and the Boston Red Sox in a span of 14 seasons from 1902–1918, and later managed the Red Sox in 1930.
March 21 – Joe Daly, 74, outfielder and catcher for the Philadelphia Athletics, Cleveland Spiders and Boston Beaneaters during three seasons from 1890–1892.
March 30 – Tex McDonald, 52, right fielder who played from 1912 to 1913 with the Cincinnati Reds and Boston Braves of the National League, and for the Pittsburgh Rebels and Buffalo Buffeds/Blues of the Federal League from 1914 to 1915.

April
April 1 – Pat Deasley, 85, Irish bare-handed catcher who played from 1881 through 1888 for the Boston Red Caps, St. Louis Browns, New York Giants and Washington Nationals.
April 11 – Tom Knowlson, 47,  pitcher for the 1915 Philadelphia Athletics.
April 22 – Kirby White, 59, pitcher for the Boston Doves and the Pittsburgh Pirates in three seasons from 1909 to 1911.
April 23 – Cliff Curtis, 61, pitcher who played for the Boston Doves/Rustlers, Chicago Cubs, Philadelphia Phillies and Brooklyn Dodgers during five seasons from 1909 to 1913.
April 26 – Bob Emslie, 84, Canadian umpire who set records with 35 seasons (34 of them, 1891 to 1924, in the National League) of officiating and over 1,000 games worked single-handedly; previously, as a pitcher, won 32 games for the 1884 Baltimore Orioles of the American Association.
April 26 – Gene McCann, 66, pitcher for the Brooklyn Superbas in the 1901 and 1902 seasons.
April 28 – Dennis Berran, 55, outfielder for the 1912 Chicago White Sox.
April 29 – Elijah Jones, 61, pitcher who played for the Detroit Tigers in 1907 and 1909.

May
May 6 – William J. Slocum, 59, sportswriter and editor for several New York newspapers since 1910.
May 7 – Bill Coughlin, 64, infielder who played for the Washington Senators and Detroit Tigers in a span of nine seasons from 1899–1908, as well as the only player to play for the Senators' National League club in its final season of 1899, and join the newly formed Senators for their 1901 inaugural season in the American League.
May 10 – Ginger Clark, 64, pitcher who played for the 1902 Cleveland Bronchos of the American League.
May 10 – Joe Werrick, 81, third baseman who played with the St. Paul Saints of the Union Association in 1884, and for the Louisville Colonels of the American Association from 1886 to 1888.
May 13 – Jack Hendricks, 68, outfielder who played from 1902 to 1903 for the New York Giants, Chicago Orphans and Washington Senators, and later managed the St. Louis Cardinals in 1918 and the Cincinnati Reds from 1924 to 1929.
May 13 – Pat Malone, 40, pitcher who posted a 115–79 record for the 1928–1934 Chicago Cubs, then a 19–13 mark for the 1935–1937 New York Yankees; led National League in wins with 22 in 1929 and 20 in 1930; NL strikeout leader (with 166) in 1930; member of 1936 and 1937 World Series champions.
May 14 – Bob Allen, 75, shortstop for the Philadelphia Phillies, Boston Beaneaters and  Cincinnati Reds in five seasons spanning 1890–1897, as well as a manager for two brief stints with the Phillies in 1890 and Cincinnati in 1900.
May 22 – Red Bowser, 61, backup outfielder for the 1910 Chicago White Sox.
May 22 – Bob Wood, 77, backup catcher who played for the Cincinnati Reds, Cleveland Blues, Cleveland Bronchos and Detroit Tigers, in a span of seven seasons from 1898–1905.
May 28 – Henri Rondeau, 56, outfielder and catcher in a 17-year career from 1909 to 1925, including parts of three seasons in Major League Baseball for the Detroit Tigers in 1913 and the Washington Senators from 1915 to 1916, while playing in all or parts of 12 seasons with the Minneapolis Millers of the American Association.
May 29 – Pat Wright, 74, second baseman who played in one game  He played in one game for the Chicago Colts of the National League in 1890.

June
June 14 – Fred Kommers, 57, outfielder who spent the 1913 season with the Pittsburgh Pirates of the National League, before moving to the outlaw Federal League to play for the St. Louis Terriers and Baltimore Terrapins in 1914.
June 19 – Art Goodwin, 67, pitcher who made one appearance with the New York Highlanders in 1905.
June 21 – Chet Chadbourne, 58, outfielder for the Boston Red Sox, Kansas City Packers and Boston Braves, who became a Minor League institution after collecting 3,216 hits over 21 seasons, as well as managing and umpiring at the same level.
June 30 – Mike McDermott, 80, pitcher who played from 1895 through 1897 for the Louisville Colonels, Cleveland Spiders and St. Louis Browns of the National League.

July
July 14 – George Pechiney, 81, pitcher who played from 1885 to 1897 for the Cleveland Blues and Cincinnati Red Stockings of the American Association. 
July 26 – Tom Gettinger, 74, outfielder who played from 1889 to 1890 with the St. Louis Brown Stockings, and then for the Louisville Colonels in 1895. 
July 30 – Charlie Fritz, 61, pitcher who played for the Philadelphia Athletics during the 1907 season.

August
August 11 – Fred Woodcock, 75, pitcher for the 1892 Pittsburgh Pirates of the National League.
August 16 – Beals Becker, 57, outfielder for five teams during eight seasons spanning 1908–1915, who made a name for himself in the Major Leagues as a dangerous slugger, ranking four times among the top-ten in home runs in the National League, while becoming the first player to hit two pinch-hit home runs in a single season, and the first to hit two inside-the-park homers in the same game.
August 14 – Joe Kelley, 71, Hall of Fame outfielder who along with John McGraw, Willie Keeler and Hughie Jennings made up the Big Four of the great Baltimore Orioles teams of the middle 1890s, playing on six pennant-winning teams during his 17-year stint in the Major Leagues and finishing with a .317 career batting average, 443 stolen bases, .402 on-base percentage and 194 triples, also driving in 100 or more runs in five straight seasons and scoring over 100 runs six times, while posting a lifetime .955 fielding percentage in the outfield to go along with 212 assists.
August 15 – Art Whitney, 85, third baseman and shortstop who played for eight teams during eleven seasons from 1880 to 1891, also a member of the New York Giants clubs that won the World Series in 1888 and 1889.
August 27 – Frank Truesdale, 59, second baseman  who played from 1910 to 1918 for the St. Louis Browns, New York Yankees and Boston Red Sox.

September
September   1 – Joe Connolly, 59, left fielder for the Boston Braves from 1913 through 1916, who was the offensive star of the 1914 Miracle Braves World Champions.
September   1 – Eddie Matteson, 58, pitcher for the Philadelphia Phillies in 1914 and the Washington Senators in 1918.
September   4 – Harry Hardy, 67, pitcher for the Washington Senators in the 1905 and 1906 seasons.
September   5 – Cecil Ferguson, 60, pitcher for the New York Giants and the Boston Doves/Rustlers in six seasons from 1906–1911, who led the National League in saves in 1906.
September 11 – Blaine Durbin, 57, pitcher who played from 1907 to 1909 with the Chicago Cubs, Cincinnati Reds and Pittsburgh Pirates.
September 14 – Bill Murray, 50, second baseman for the 1917 Washington Senators.
September 22 – Larry Hesterfer, 65, pitcher for the New York Giants during the 1901 season, who is best known as the only player to have hit into a triple play in his first at bat in Major League history.

October
October 15 – Joe Rickert, 66, outfielder who played for the Pittsburgh Pirates in the 1898 season and the Boston Beaneaters in 1901.
October 23 – Heinie Peitz, 72, catcher for four teams in a span of 16 seasons from 1892–1913, who formed part of the famed Pretzel Battery along with pitcher Ted Breitenstein while playing for the St. Louis Browns and the Cincinnati Reds in the 1890s.
October 30 – Frank Whitney, 87, outfielder who played for the Boston Red Caps in the 1876 season.

November
November   7 – Bill Wolff, 67, pitcher for the 1902 Philadelphia Phillies.
November 10 – Charlie Bastian, 71, shortstop who played for seven teams in four different Major Leagues during eight seasons spanning 1884–1891.
November 16 – Frank McPartlin, 71, pitcher for the New York Giants in the 1899 season.

December
December   3 – Mike Grady, 73, catcher who played for the Philadelphia Phillies, St. Louis Browns, New York Giants, Washington Senators and St. Louis Cardinals, during eleven seasons between 1894 and 1906.
December   6 – Charley Hall, 59, who pitched for the Cincinnati Reds, Boston Red Sox, St. Louis Cardinals and Detroit Tigers in nine seasons between 1906 and 1918, and also was a member of the 1912 World Champion Red Sox.
December   6 – George Magoon, 68, middle infielder who played in the National League with the Brooklyn Bridegrooms, Baltimore Orioles, Chicago Orphans and Cincinnati Reds, and for the American League's Chicago White Sox in a span of six seasons from 1898–1903.
December 18 – Bill Conway, 82, catcher who entered the National League in 1884 with the Philadelphia Quakers, appearing in one game for them before playing seven games with the Baltimore Orioles in 1886.
December 19 – Bill Bergen, 65, fine defensive catcher who played from 1901 through 1911 with the Cincinnati Reds, and for the Brooklyn's Superbas and Dodgers clubs from 1904 to 1911.
December 21 – Jim Cudworth, 85, outfielder and first baseman who played for the Kansas City Cowboys of the Union Association in 1884.
December 21 – Jack Warner, 71, catcher who played for the Boston Beaneaters, Louisville Colonels, New York Giants, Boston Americans, St. Louis Cardinals, Detroit Tigers and Washington Senators in 14 seasons from 1895 through 1908, and was also a member of the 1904 World Champion Giants.
December 28 – Steve Evans, 58, outfielder who played in the National League with the New York Giants in 1908 and the St. Louis Cardinals from 1910 through 1913, and for the Brooklyn Tip-Tops and Baltimore Terrapins of the Federal League from 1914 to 1915.

Sources

External links

Baseball Reference – 1943 MLB Season Summary  
Baseball Reference – MLB Players born in 1943
Baseball Reference – MLB Players died in 1943